Eileen McGann is an American lawyer, columnist, and author. Married to political consultant and commentator Dick Morris, McGann is frequently credited as a co-writer in Morris' literary output.

McGann and Morris were depicted on the September 9, 1996, cover of Time magazine.

Selected works 
 Because He Could (2004, with Dick Morris) 
 Condi vs. Hillary: The Next Great Presidential Race (2005, with Dick Morris) 
 Outrage: How Illegal Immigration, the United Nations, Congressional Ripoffs, Student Loan Overcharges, Tobacco Companies, Trade Protection, and Drug Companies are Ripping Us Off . . . And What to Do About It (2007, with Dick Morris) 
 Catastrophe: How Obama, Congress, and the Special Interests Are Transforming a Slump Into a Crash, Freedom Into Socialism, and a Disaster Into a Catastrophe . . . and How to Fight Back (2008, with Dick Morris) 
 Fleeced: How Barack Obama, Media Mockery of Terrorist Threats, Liberals Who Want To Kill Talk Radio, the Do-Nothing Congress, Companies That Help Iran, and Washington Lobbyists for Foreign Governments Are Scamming Us...And What To Do About It (2008, with Dick Morris) 
 Revolt! How to Defeat Obama and Repeal His Socialist Programs (2011, with Dick Morris) 
 Screwed: How Foreign Countries Are Ripping America Off and Plundering Our Economy-and How Our Leaders Help Them Do It (2012, with Dick Morris) 
 Here Come the Black Helicopters!: UN Global Governance and the Loss of Freedom (2012, with Dick Morris) 
 Armageddon: How Trump Can Beat Hillary (2016, with Dick Morris) 
 Rogue Spooks: The Intelligence War on Donald Trump (2017, with Dick Morris)

References

Living people
American lawyers
American columnists
21st-century American non-fiction writers
21st-century American women writers
American women columnists
Year of birth missing (living people)